Tom Warne (13 January 1870 – 7 July 1944) was an Australian cricketer. He played 46 first-class cricket matches for Victoria between 1895 and 1912. He toured New Zealand with the Australian team in 1909–10 but did not play Test cricket.

Biography 
Warne's top score for Victoria was 153 against Tasmania in 1911–12, in the second innings of his last first-class match, when he captained Victoria. In 1901–02 he carried his bat for 61 not out when A. C. MacLaren's XI dismissed Victoria for 129. His best bowling figures were 6 for 50 against New South Wales in 1906–07.

Over almost 30 years he made nearly 10,000 runs for Carlton in Melbourne district cricket. In 1898–99 he became the first person in the competition to score 1000 runs in a season, with 1011 runs at an average of 126, including a top score of 402 against Richmond. He spent the rest of his life as the curator of Carlton's ground. He died at his residence at the ground. He and his wife Alice had six sons (including the cricketer Frank Warne) and six daughters.

See also
 List of Victoria first-class cricketers

References

External links
 
 Tom Warne at CricketArchive

1870 births
1944 deaths
Australian cricketers
Victoria cricketers
Cricketers from Melbourne